KDEL (Lys-Asp-Glu-Leu) endoplasmic reticulum protein retention receptors (KDELR) are the members of a group of receptor proteins:
 KDELR1
 KDELR2
 KDELR3

References

Human proteins